Chesterton Lane Halt railway station was one of two intermediate halts on the Cirencester branch line from , Gloucestershire, England. It was only open for five years between 1959 and 1964.

History
The halt opened under British Railways and closed under the Beeching Axe. It consisted of a rail level platform mainly built of old sleepers only long enough to accommodate the single coach railbus which operated the line. The halt closed with the end of passenger services on the Cirencester Town branch on 6 April 1964, the last trains having run on the evening of 5 April.
Since closure the cutting in which halt was sited has been infilled upon which Meadow Road has been built.

Reopening

As of 2016, discussion have been taking place about rebuilding 5 km of track to Chesterton Lane Halt in order to reconnect Cirencester to the railway network. The plans would see a new station built near Chesterton Lane Halt.

Notes

Disused railway stations in Gloucestershire
Railway stations opened by British Rail
Railway stations in Great Britain opened in 1959
Railway stations in Great Britain closed in 1964
Cirencester
Beeching closures in England